The 1881–82 season was the third season in which Bolton Wanderers competed in a senior competitive football competition. The club entered the FA Cup in November 1883, but were knocked out in the fourth round by Notts County.

F.A. Cup

See also
Bolton Wanderers F.C. seasons

References

Bolton Wanderers F.C. seasons
Bolton Wanderers F.C.